Dolní Krupá may refer to places in the Czech Republic:

Dolní Krupá (Havlíčkův Brod District), a municipality and village in the Vysočina Region, 
Dolní Krupá (Mladá Boleslav District), a municipality and village in the Central Bohemian Region